is a Japanese astronomer credited by the Minor Planet Center with the discovery of 105 asteroids he made partially in collaboration with astronomer Tsutomu Hioki at Okutama Observatory, Japan, between 1988 and 2000.

He is also known for the recovery of 724 Hapag in 1988, a long-lost asteroid discovered by Austrian astronomer Johann Palisa in 1911. As of 2016, most of his discoveries, such as the inner main-belt asteroid , remain unnamed.

The Mars-crosser asteroid 4910 Kawasato, discovered by German astronomer Karl Reinmuth, was named in his honor on 1 September 1993.

List of discovered minor planets

References 
 

20th-century Japanese astronomers
Discoverers of asteroids

Living people
Year of birth missing (living people)